The Fengcheng Reservoir is a reservoir on the Irtysh–Karamay Canal in China's Xinjiang Uighur Autonomous Region. It is about 15 km north of the main urban area of Urho District of Karamay City;
administratively, the location is near the border of Urho District and Hoboksar Mongol Autonomous County. 

Located in the "tail" part of the Irtysh-Karamay Canal, the main function of the reservoir is to control the water flow along the canal. Its volume can vary from the minimum of 8 million m3 to the maximum of 100 million m3; at the highest water level, the reservoir area is 6.2 km2. The lowest water level is 445 m above the sea level.

The reservoir sits in a natural depression, surrounded by dams in most directions. It was constructed in 1998–2000.

Notes

Dams in China
Dams completed in 2000